Viyyoor is a residential area situated in the city of Thrissur in Kerala state of India. Viyyur is Ward 4 of Thrissur Municipal Corporation. It is dotted by a number of temples, churches, Mosques and is surrounded by lush greenery. It is about 4 km from Swaraj Round. It has one of the three central jails in Kerala, Viyyoor Central Jail.

Institutions
 Viyyoor Central Jail 
 Government Engineering College, Thrissur
 District Institute for Education and Training
 Hindi Training College
 Viyyur Grameena vayanasala
 St. Francis L.P. School
 110 kV substation
 Viyyur Post Office

Major places of worship
Viyyoor Shiva Temple, which stands on the entrance of Viyyoor near the Viyyoor bridge.
RC Church of Our Lady of Perpetual Help (Nithya Sahaya MAtha Church). 
Viyyoor Manalarukavu devi temple, famous for the kavadi mahotsavam celebrated every year.

See also
Thrissur
Thrissur District
List of Thrissur Corporation wards

Suburbs of Thrissur city